Wang Shiwei (born 11 August 1996) is a Chinese speed skater.

He won a medal at the 2020 World Single Distances Speed Skating Championships.

References

External links

1996 births
Living people
Chinese male speed skaters
Sportspeople from Shenyang
World Single Distances Speed Skating Championships medalists
21st-century Chinese people